The Football League Fourth Division was the fourth-highest division in the English football league system from the 1958–59 season until the creation of the Premier League prior to the 1992–93 season. Following the creation of the Premier League, the fourth tier of English football was renamed the Football League Third Division, before being rebranded as Football League Two in 2004.

History 
The Fourth Division was created in 1958 alongside a new national Third Division by merging the regionalised Third Division North and Third Division South. The original economic reasons for having the two regional leagues had become less apparent and thus it was decided to create two national leagues at levels three and four. The twelve best teams of each regional league in 1957–58 went into the Third Division, and the rest became founder members of the Fourth Division.

Founder members of Fourth Division were:
 From Third Division North: Barrow, Bradford (Park Avenue), Carlisle United, Chester City, Crewe Alexandra, Darlington, Gateshead, Hartlepools United, Oldham Athletic, Southport, Workington, York City
 From Third Division South: Aldershot, Coventry City, Crystal Palace, Exeter City, Gillingham, Millwall, Northampton Town, Port Vale, Shrewsbury Town, Torquay United, Walsall, Watford

Before 1987, the top four teams were promoted to the Third Division and the bottom four teams were subject to a re-election vote by other league clubs to determine whether they would remain in the league. Automatic relegation to the Conference was introduced in 1987, the same year the fourth promotion place began to be decided through a play-off.

The highest average league attendance in the Fourth Division was 19,092, achieved by Crystal Palace in the 1960/61 season. The highest attendance at an individual match was recorded the same season: 37,774 for the Good Friday game at Selhurst Park between Crystal Palace and Millwall.

Promotions and relegation
Automatic relegation between the Fourth Division and the Conference was introduced for the 1986–87 season.

Elections to the Football League

Promotions and relegations from Football Conference

Previous League champions
See List of winners of English Football League Two and predecessors.

Play-offs
See Football League Two Play-offs.

References

 
4
Eng